Fearn railway station is a railway station serving the village of Hill of Fearn in the Highland council area of Scotland, located around  from the village. It is situated on the Far North Line,  form , between Tain and Invergordon, and is also the nearest station to Balintore, Hilton and Shandwick (the Seaboard Villages), Portmahomack and the Nigg Bay area of Easter Ross. ScotRail, who manage the station, operate all services.

History 
The station opened on 1 June 1864, as part of the Inverness and Ross-shire Railway, later the Highland Railway and then the London, Midland and Scottish Railway.

Facilities 
As well as a small car park, there are bike racks, a bench, a waiting shelter and a help point. The station has step free access. As there are no facilities to purchase tickets, passengers must buy one in advance, or from the guard on the train.

Platform layout 
The station has a single platform which is long enough for a seven-coach train. The platform is very low and this gives rise to difficulties for passengers who are in any way infirm and unable to climb the height to the coaches, so there are portable steps available at the station. At the approach to Fearn station, conductors are obliged to use public address systems to warn alighting passengers of the low platform, and they also frequently do this when inspecting tickets of passengers travelling to Fearn.

Passenger volume 

The statistics cover twelve month periods that start in April.

Services
As of the December 2021 timetable, on weekdays and Saturdays, the stations sees 6 trains northbound (4 to Wick via Thurso, 1 to Tain, and 1 to Ardgay), and 7 trains southbound to Inverness. On Sundays, the station sees 4 trains northbound (1 to Wick via Thurso, 3 to Tain) and 4 trains to Inverness.

References

Bibliography 

 
 

Railway stations in Highland (council area)
Railway stations in Great Britain opened in 1864
Railway stations served by ScotRail
Former Highland Railway stations
Listed railway stations in Scotland
Category B listed buildings in Highland (council area)